Sena Kalyan Bhaban is a 21-storied commercial building located at 195, Motijheel Commercial Area, Dhaka on an area of 1.35 bighas of land. Previously, on the same space there was a rest house for ex-armed forces personnel. The foundation stone of the 21-storied Sena Kalyan Bhaban was laid in April 1982. Construction was completed in August 1990. The total floor space of the building is  sq. ft. and the rentable space is  sq. ft. It is a building for the Sena Kalyan Sangstha.

See also
 List of tallest buildings in Dhaka
 List of tallest buildings in Bangladesh

References 

Buildings and structures in Dhaka
Skyscraper office buildings in Bangladesh
Motijheel Thana
Office buildings completed in 1990